Provincial elections were held in Vojvodina on 3 and 17 November 1996.

Electoral system
The 120 members of the Assembly of the Autonomous Province of Vojvodina were elected from 120 electoral districts using the first-past-the-post system.

Results

See also
Autonomous Province of Vojvodina
Politics of Vojvodina

References

Vojvodina
Elections in Vojvodina
Vojvodina